Mike Bauer and João Cunha Silva were the defending champions, but Cunha Silva did not participate this year.  Bauer partnered David Rikl, losing in the final.

Sergio Casal and Emilio Sánchez won the title, defeating Bauer and Rikl 6–4, 6–4 in the final.

Seeds

  Sergio Casal /  Emilio Sánchez (champions)
  Diego Nargiso /  Javier Sánchez (quarterfinals)
  Bret Garnett /  T.J. Middleton (quarterfinals)
  Kent Kinnear /  David Wheaton (semifinals)

Draw

Draw

External links
Draw

Doubles